The Chesapeake was a daily passenger train operated by Amtrak along the Northeast Corridor between Washington, D.C. and Philadelphia, Pennsylvania from 1978 to 1983. It was one of the few commuter trains operated by Amtrak.

History 

Service began on May 1, 1978, with funding from the Commonwealth of Pennsylvania and the State of Maryland; a demonstration trip ran from Philadelphia to Bowie on April 30.  BWI Rail Station was added to the service when it opened in October 1980. From February 4, 1980 to October 25, 1981, the Chesapeake was extended from 30th Street to Suburban Station.

The train primarily served higher-ranking business executives and government officials on the southbound trip in the morning, as it arrived too late for most civil servants. The northbound trip primarily served the latter group, as it departed too early to serve the morning riders for their return trip.

On January 1, 1983, Conrail was relieved of its obligation to run commuter service. Commuter service in Pennsylvania was merged into SEPTA Regional Rail, and MDOT contracted with Amtrak to run other Washington–Baltimore commuter trips. The Chesapeake was discontinued on October 30, 1983 and replaced by an unnamed Washington–Baltimore train. Commuter rail service is now provided over the former route of the Chesapeakeexcepting the segment between Perryville and Newark by the SEPTA Wilmington/Newark Line and MARC Penn Line.

Equipment 
The Chesapeake operated with leased Arrow electric multiple units.

Station stops 
The following station stops were made by Chesapeake trains during the October 1980 to October 1981 period:

See also 
 List of Amtrak routes#Northeast Corridor for other Amtrak trains named Chesapeake.

References

External links 
 October 1, 1979 Amtrak Chesapeake Timetable (Railroad Picture Archives)
Inaugural Run of Amtrak's Chesapeake (Window on Cecil County's Past)

Former Amtrak routes
Passenger rail transportation in Washington, D.C.
Passenger rail transportation in Maryland
Passenger rail transportation in Delaware
Passenger rail transportation in Pennsylvania
Railway services introduced in 1978
Railway services discontinued in 1983